The United States was the host nation for the 2002 Winter Paralympics in Salt Lake City. A total of 57 U.S. competitors (41 male and 16 female) took part in all four sports. The United States finished second in the gold medal and first in the total medal count.

Medalists

The following American athletes won medals at the games. In the 'by discipline' sections below, medalists' names are in bold.

See also
United States at the 2002 Winter Olympics

References

External links
2002 Winter Paralympics official website

Nations at the 2002 Winter Paralympics
2002
Paralympics